Gobanle  is a town located in Somalia Lower Shabelle region.  It is located at 56 km (35 mi) North of Wanlaweyn District and 136 km (85mi) North East of the Somalian capital Mogadishu

References

Populated places in Lower Shebelle